Carrè is a town in the province of Vicenza, Veneto, Italy. It is east of SP349.

Twin towns
Carrè is twinned with:

  Compans, France, since 2004

References

(Google Maps)

Cities and towns in Veneto